The 1937 NCAA Swimming and Diving Championships were contested at the University of Minnesota Armory at the University of Minnesota in Minneapolis, Minnesota as part of the 14th annual NCAA swim meet to determine the team and individual national champions of men's collegiate swimming and diving in the United States. 

Even though NCAA swimming championships had been held since 1924, this was the first event with an official team championship.

Michigan won the inaugural official team national championship, defeating rival Ohio State by 36 points, 75–39. It was the first official NCAA title for the Wolverines but their eighth including the unofficial titles won between 1924 and 1936.

Team results

Individual events

Swimming

Diving

See also
List of college swimming and diving teams

References

NCAA Division I Men's Swimming and Diving Championships
NCAA Swimming And Diving Championships
NCAA Swimming And Diving Championships